Joana Arantes (born 11 August 1972) is a Portuguese swimmer. She competed in two events at the 1992 Summer Olympics.

References

External links
 

1972 births
Living people
Portuguese female swimmers
Olympic swimmers of Portugal
Swimmers at the 1992 Summer Olympics
Swimmers from Lisbon